Luke Simpkin (born 5 May 1979 in Derby) is a British light heavyweight boxer based in Swadlincote, Derbyshire, England. His record stands at 11 wins, 32 losses and 3 draws after 46 bouts.

Simpkin competed in the "Prizefighter" competition in Newcastle-upon-Tyne on 12 September 2008. Defeating Dave Ferguson in the opening round, Simpkin went on to fight Sam Sexton.
Sexton subsequently took Simpkin out of contention winning the match by unanimous decision and continued on to win the competition.

References

External links
 
 Luke Simpkin profile at BritishBoxing.net

1979 births
Living people
People from Swadlincote
Sportspeople from Derbyshire
Boxers from Derby
English male boxers
Heavyweight boxers
Prizefighter contestants